Baron Harington of Exton was a title in the Peerage of England, created on 21 July 1603 for John Harington (d. 1613) of Exton Hall, Rutland. It became extinct on the death of his son John Harington in 1614.

The 1st Baron was the eldest son of Sir James Harrington (c.1511–1592) of Exton. The third son of Sir James Harington was Sir James Harington, 1st Baronet.

Barons Harington of Exton (1603)
John Harington, 1st Baron Harington of Exton (d. 1613)
John Harington, 2nd Baron Harington of Exton (1572–1614)

See also
Harington baronets

References
 John Taplin Shakespeare's Granddaughter and the Bagleys of Dudley published by the Black Country Society June 2005 (Originally published in 38/4, 39/1 and 39/2 of The Blackcountryman).

Footnotes

1603 establishments in England
Extinct baronies in the Peerage of England
Noble titles created in 1603
Harington family